Co-op society stores are department stores put up by the Kuwaiti Government. 

Comprising 70% of the retail trade in Kuwait, the legal basis for consumer cooperatives was established in 1962 with law No. 20. By the start of the 1980s, Kuwait's cooperative movement became open to Arab and international cooperative movements, and the Kuwaiti Union for Cooperative Societies sought membership in the International Cooperative Alliance as of March 1981. All the cooperative society come under the Union of Consumer Cooperative Societies.

References 

Department stores of Kuwait
Cooperatives in Kuwait
Consumers' cooperatives